Carter M. Stewart (born April 11, 1969) is an American attorney who served as the United States Attorney for the Southern District of Ohio from 2009 to 2016.

He graduated from Stanford University, Columbia University, and Harvard Law School.  He also teaches at the Moritz College of Law.

References

1969 births
Living people
United States Attorneys for the Southern District of Ohio
Ohio Democrats
Moritz College of Law faculty
Stanford University alumni
Columbia University alumni
Harvard Law School alumni
21st-century American lawyers